The New York World-Telegram, later known as the New York World-Telegram and The Sun, was a New York City newspaper from 1931 to 1966.

History
Founded by James Gordon Bennett Sr. as The Evening Telegram in 1867, the newspaper began as the evening edition of The New York Herald, which itself published its first issue in 1835. Following Bennett's death, newspaper and magazine owner Frank A. Munsey purchased The Telegram in June 1920. Munsey's associate Thomas W. Dewart, the late publisher and president of the New York Sun, owned the paper for two years after Munsey died in 1925 before selling it to the E. W. Scripps Company for an undisclosed sum in 1927. At the time of the sale, the paper was known as The New York Telegram, and it had a circulation of 200,000.

The newspaper became the World-Telegram in 1931, following the sale of the New York World by the heirs of Joseph Pulitzer to Scripps Howard. More than 2,000 employees of the morning, evening and Sunday editions of the World lost their jobs in the merger, although some star writers, like Heywood Broun and Westbrook Pegler, were kept on the new paper.

The World-Telegram enjoyed a reputation as a liberal paper for some years after the merger, based on memories of the Pulitzer-owned World. However, under Scripps Howard the paper moved steadily to the right, eventually becoming a conservative bastion described by the press critic A.J. Liebling as "Republican, anti-labor, and suspicious of anything European." (Liebling also called the paper "the organ of New York's displaced persons (displaced from the interior of North America.)")

In 1940, the paper carried a series of articles entitled "The Rape of China," which used Walter Judd's experiences with Japanese soldiers as the basis of support for a campaign to boycott Japanese goods. Publisher Roy Howard, an expert of sorts after travelling to Manchuria and Japan in the early 1930s, gave extensive coverage of Japanese atrocities in China. The paper's headline of December 8, 1941, read "1500 Dead in Hawaii" in its coverage of Japan's attack on Pearl Harbor.

New York World-Telegram and The Sun
In 1950, the paper became the New York World-Telegram and The Sun after Dewart and his family sold Scripps the remnants of another afternoon paper, the New York Sun. (Liebling once described The Sun on the combined publication's nameplate as resembling the tail feathers of a canary on the chin of a cat.)

New York World Journal Tribune

Early in 1966, a proposal to create New York's first joint operating agreement led to the merger of the World-Telegram and The Sun with Hearst's Journal American. The intention was to produce a joint afternoon edition, with a separate morning paper to be produced by the Herald Tribune. The last edition of the World-Telegram and The Sun was published on April 23, 1966. But when strikes prevented the JOA from taking effect, the papers instead united in August 1966 to become the short-lived New York World Journal Tribune, which lasted only until May 5, 1967. Its closure left New York City with three daily newspapers: The New York Times, the New York Post and the New York Daily News.

The archives of the paper are not available online, but they can be accessed at the Library of Congress, the University of Wisconsin-Madison, and several research facilities in the state of New York.

Gallery

See also
Media of New York City

References

External links

Library of Congress New York World Telegram and Sun Newspaper Photograph Collection

Defunct newspapers published in New York City
Pulitzer Prize-winning newspapers
Pulitzer Prize for Public Service winners
Newspapers established in 1867
Publications disestablished in 1966
1931 establishments in New York City
1966 disestablishments in New York (state)
New York Herald
Daily newspapers published in New York City